The TakeOut Comedy Club Hong Kong is a venue for stand-up comedy and improvisational comedy located at 34 Elgin Street, basement, Central, Hong Kong. Founded in February 2007 by Jami Gong, a leading Chinese American stand-up comedian, TakeOut Comedy is the first full-time comedy club in Asia. The club fosters local English and Cantonese-speaking talent and has hosted well-known comedians from around the world, including Tim Jones, Ted Alexandro, Al Ducharme, Butch Bradley Tom Cotter and Paul Ogata.

References

External links 
 TakeOut Comedy's website
 HK International Comedy Festival's website

Event venues established in 2007
Comedy clubs in Hong Kong